Safed massacre relates to several violent events, happened in different time periods in the town of Safed, Galilee (currently under jurisdiction of Israel). Safed massacre may refer to:
 1660 destruction of Safed, during Druze power struggle
 1834 looting of Safed, during Syrian Peasant Revolt (1834–35)
 1838 Druze attack on Safed, during 1838 Druze revolt
 1929 Safed riots, during 1929 Palestine riots

See also
History of the Jews and Judaism in the Land of Israel
Safed